Atari, Inc. was an American video game developer and home computer company founded in 1972 by Nolan Bushnell and Ted Dabney. Atari was a key player in the formation of the video arcade and video game industry.

Based primarily around the Sunnyvale, California, area in the center of Silicon Valley, the company was initially formed to develop arcade games, launching with Pong in 1972. As computer technology matured with low-cost integrated circuits, Atari ventured into the consumer market, first with dedicated home versions of Pong and other arcade successes around 1975, and into programmable consoles using game cartridges with the Atari Video Computer System (Atari VCS or later branded as the Atari 2600) in 1977. To bring the Atari VCS to market, Bushnell sold Atari to Warner Communications in 1976. In 1978, Warner brought in Ray Kassar to help run the company, but over the next few years, gave Kassar more of a leadership role in the company. Bushnell was fired in 1978, with Kassar named CEO in 1979.

From 1978 through 1982, Atari continued to expand at a great pace and was the leading company in the growing video game industry. Its arcade games such as Asteroids helped to usher in a golden age of arcade games from 1979 to 1983, while the arcade conversion of Taito's Space Invaders for the VCS became the console's system seller and killer application. Atari's success brought new console manufacturers to the market including Mattel Electronics and Coleco, as well as the creation of third-party developers such as Activision and Imagic.

Facing new competition heading into 1982, Atari made a number of poor decisions to try to maintain their leadership position. These decisions resulted in overproduction of units and games that did not meet sales expectations and eroded consumer confidence in Atari. Atari had also ventured into the home computer market with their first 8-bit computers, but their products did not fare as well as their competitors'. Kassar resigned as CEO in mid-1983 amid mounting losses and was replaced by James J. Morgan who instituted a number of cost-cutting procedures to turn Atari around, including a large number of layoffs. However, Atari's financial hardships had already reverberated through the industry, leading to the 1983 video game crash that devastated the video game market in the United States.

Warner Communications sold the home console and computer division of Atari to Jack Tramiel in July 1984, who then renamed his company Atari Corporation. Atari, Inc. was renamed Atari Games, Inc. after the sale. In 1985, Warner formed a new corporation jointly with Namco, AT Games, Inc., which acquired the coin-operated assets of Atari Games, Inc.  AT Games was subsequently renamed Atari Games Corporation. Atari Games, Inc. was then renamed Atari Holdings, Inc. and remained a non-operating subsidiary of Warner Communications and its successor, Time Warner, before being merged back into the parent company in 1992.

Origins

While studying at the University of Utah, electrical engineering student Nolan Bushnell had a part-time job at an amusement arcade, where he became familiar with arcade electro-mechanical games such as Chicago Coin's racing game Speedway (1969). He watched customers play and helped maintain the machinery, while learning how it worked and developing his understanding of how the game business operates.

In 1968, Bushnell graduated, became an employee of Ampex in San Francisco and worked alongside Ted Dabney. The two found they had shared interests and became friends.  Bushnell shared with Dabney his gaming-pizza parlor idea, and had taken him to the computer lab at Stanford Artificial Intelligence Laboratory to see the games on those systems. They jointly developed the concept of using a standalone computer system with a monitor and attaching a coin slot to it to play games on.

They had also asked fellow Ampex employee Larry Bryan to participate, and while he had been on board with their ideas, he backed out when asked to contribute financially to starting the company.

Bushnell and Dabney worked with Nutting Associates to manufacture their product. Dabney developed a method of using video circuitry components to mimic functions of a computer for a much cheaper cost and a smaller space. Bushnell and Dabney used this to develop a variation on Spacewar! called Computer Space where the player shot at two UFOs. Nutting manufactured the game. While they were developing this, they joined Nutting as engineers, but they also made sure that Nutting placed a "Syzygy Engineered" label on the control panel of each Computer Space game sold to reflect their work in the game. Computer Space did not fare well commercially when it was placed in Nutting's customary market: bars. Feeling that the game was simply too complex for the average customer unfamiliar and unsure with the new technology, Bushnell started looking for new ideas. About 1,500 Computer Space cabinets were made, but were a difficult product to sell. While Bushnell blamed Nutting for its poor marketing, he later recognized that Computer Space was too complex of a game as players had to read the instructions on the cabinet before they could play. Bushnell said: "To be successful, I had to come up with a game people already knew how to play; something so simple that any drunk at any bar could play."

As a private company

Founding and Pong (1972)

Bushnell began seeking other partners outside of Nutting, and approached pinball game manufacturer Bally Manufacturing, who indicated interest in funding future efforts in arcade games by Bushnell and Dabney if Nutting was not involved. The two quit Nutting and established offices for Syzygy in Santa Clara; at that point not taking a salary yet since they had no products. Bally then offered them a  a month for six months to design a new video game and a new pinball machine. With those funds, they hired Al Alcorn, a former co-worker at Ampex, as their first design engineer. Bushnell had originally planned to develop a driving video game, influenced by Chicago Coin's Speedway which at the time was the biggest-selling electro-mechanical game at his arcade. Initially wanting to start Syzygy off with a driving game, Bushnell had concerns that it might be too complicated for Alcorn's first game.

In May 1972, Bushnell had seen a demonstration of the Magnavox Odyssey, which included a tennis game. According to Alcorn, Bushnell decided to have him produce an arcade version of the Odyssey's Tennis game, which would go on to be named Pong. Bushnell had Alcorn use Dabney's video circuit concepts to help develop the game, believing it would be a first prototype, but Alcorn's success impressed both Bushnell and Dabney, leading them to believe they had a major success on hand and prepared to offer the game to Bally as part of the contract.

Meanwhile, Bushnell and Dabney had gone to incorporate the firm, but found that Syzygy (an astronomical term) already existed in California.  Bushnell enjoyed the strategy board game Go, and in considering various terms from the game, they chose to name the company atari, a Japanese term  that in the context of the game means a state where a stone or group of stones is imminently in danger of being taken by one's opponent (equivalent to the concept of check in chess). Other terms Bushnell had offer included sente (when a Go player has the initiative; Bushnell would use this term years later to name another company of his) and hane (a Go move to go around an opponent's pieces). Atari was incorporated in the state of California on June 27, 1972.

Bushnell and Dabney offered to license Pong to both Bally and its Midway subsidiary, but both companies rejected it because it required two players. Instead, Bushnell and Dabney opted to create a test unit themselves and see how it was received at a local establishment. By August 1972, the first Pong was completed. It consisted of a black and white television from Walgreens, the special game hardware, and a coin mechanism from a laundromat on the side which featured a milk carton inside to catch coins. It was placed in a Sunnyvale tavern by the name of Andy Capp's to test its viability. The Andy Capp test was extremely successful, so the company created twelve more test units, ten which were distributed across other local bars. They found that the machines were averaging around  a week each; in several cases, when bar owners reported that the machines were malfunctioning, Alcorn found that it was due to the coin collector had been overflowing with quarters, shorting out the coin slot mechanism. They reported these numbers to Bally, who still had not decided on taking the license. Bushnell and Dabney realized that they needed to expand on the game but formally needed to get out of their contract with Bally. Bushnell told Bally that they could offer to make another game for them, but only if they rejected Pong; Bally agreed, letting Atari off the hook for the pinball machine design as well.

After talks to release Pong through Nutting and several other companies broke down, Bushnell and Dabney decided to release Pong on their own, and Atari, Inc. transformed into a coin-op design and production company. Using investments and funds from a coin-operated machine route, they leased a former concert hall and roller rink in Santa Clara to produce Pong cabinets on their own with hired help for the production line. Bushnell had also set up arrangements with local coin-op-game distributors to help move units. Atari shipped their first commercial Pong unit in November 1972. Over 2,500 Pong cabinets were made in 1973, and by the end of its production in 1974, Atari had made over 8,000 Pong cabinets.

Atari could not produce Pong cabinets fast enough to meet the new demand, leading to a number of existing companies in the electro-mechanical games industry and new ventures to produce their own versions of Pong. Ralph H. Baer, who had patented the concepts behind the Odyssey through his employer Sanders Associates, felt Pong and these other games infringed on his ideas. Magnavox filed suit against Atari and others in April 1974 for patent infringement. Under legal counsel's advice, Bushnell opted to have Atari settle out of court with Magnavox by June 1976, agreeing to pay  in eight installments for a perpetual license for Baer's patents and to share technical information and grant a license to use the technology found in all current Atari products and any new products announced between June 1, 1976, and June 1, 1977.

Early arcade and home games (1973–1976)
Around 1973, Bushnell began to expand out the company, moving their corporate headquarters to Los Gatos. Bushnell contracted graphic design artist George Opperman, who ran his own design firm, to create a logo for Atari. Opperman has stated that the logo that was selected was based on the letter "A" but considering Atari's success with Pong, created the logo to fit the "A" shape, with two players on opposite sides of a center line. However, some within Atari at this time dispute this, stating that Opperman had provided several different possible designs and this was the one selected by Bushnell and others. The logo first appeared on Atari's arcade game Space Race in 1973, and had become known as the "Fuji" due to its resemblance to Mount Fuji. Opperman was later hired directly into Atari to establish the company's own art and design division in 1976.

From late 1972 to early 1973, a rift in the business relationship between Bushnell and Dabney began to develop, with Dabney feeling he was being pushed to the side by Bushnell while Bushnell saw Dabney as a potential roadblock to his larger plans for Atari. While Dabney would continue to work for Bushnell on other ventures, including Pizza Time Theaters, he had a falling out with Bushnell and ultimately left the video game industry.

In mid-1973, Atari acquired Cyan Engineering, a computer engineering firm founded by Steve Mayer and Larry Emmons, following a consulting contract with Atari. Bushnell established Atari's internal Grass Valley Think Tank at Cyan to promote research & development of new games and products.

Atari secretly spawned a "competitor" called Kee Games in September 1973, headed by Bushnell's next door neighbor Joe Keenan, to circumvent pinball distributors' insistence on exclusive distribution deals; both Atari and Kee could market (virtually) the same game to different distributors, with each getting an "exclusive" deal. Kee was further led by Atari employees: Steve Bristow, a developer that worked under Alcorn on arcade games, Bill White, and Gil Williams. While early Kee games were near-copies of Atari's own games, Kee began developing their own titles such as that drew distributor interest to Kee and effectively helping Bushnell to realize the disruption of the exclusive distribution deals.

In 1974, Atari began to see financial struggles and Bushnell was forced to lay off half the staff. Atari was facing increased competition from new arcade game producers, many which made clones of Pong and other Atari games. An accounting mistake caused them to lose money on the release of Gran Trak 10. Among other international distribution partnerships being established by Ron Gordon, their vice president of international marketing, Atari also tried to open a division in Japan as Atari Japan to sell their games through, but the venture had several roadblocks. In a 2018 interview Alcorn described the situation as "an utter disaster beyond recognition". Bushnell said "We didn't realize that Japan was a closed market, and so we were in violation of all kinds of rules and regulations of the Japanese, and they were starting to give us a real bad time." Gordon "fixed all that for us for a huge commission" according to Bushnell. Bushnell has claimed that deals arranged by Gordon saved Atari. Gordon further suggested that Atari merge Kee Games into Atari in September 1974, just ahead of the release of Tank in November 1974. Tank was a success in the arcade, and Atari was able to reestablish its financial stability by the end of the year. In the merger, Joe Keenan was kept on as president of Atari while Bushnell stayed at CEO.

Having avoided bankruptcy, Atari continued to expand on its arcade game offerings in 1975. The additional financial stability also allowed Atari to pursue new product ideas. One of these was the idea of a home version of Pong, a concept they had first considered as early as 1973. The cost of integrated circuits to support a home version had fallen enough to be suitable for a home console by 1974, and initial design work on console began in earnest in late 1974 by Alcorn, Harold Lee and Bob Brown. Atari struggled to find a distributor for the console but eventually arranged a deal with Sears to make 150,000 units by the end of 1975 for the holiday season. Atari was able to meet Sears' order with additional  investments during 1975. The home Pong console (branded as Sears Tele-Game) was high-demand product that season, and established Atari with a viable home console division in addition to their arcade division. By 1976, Atari began releasing home Pong consoles, including Pong variants, under their own brand name. The success of home Pong drew a similar range of competitors to this market, including Coleco with their Telstar series of consoles.

In 1975, Bushnell started an effort to produce a flexible video game console that was capable of playing all four of Atari's then-current games. Instead, a programmable console with swappable games would be far more lucrative. Development took place at Cyan Engineering, which initially had serious difficulties trying to produce such a machine. However, in early 1976, MOS Technology released the first inexpensive microprocessor, the 6502, which had sufficient performance for Atari's needs. Atari hired Joe Decuir and Jay Miner to develop the hardware and custom Television Interface Adaptor for this new console. Their project, under the codename of "Stella", would become the Atari Video Computer System (Atari VCS).

Workplace culture
Atari, as a private company under Bushnell, gained a reputation for relaxed employee policies in areas such as formal hours and dress codes, and company-sponsored recreational activities involving alcohol, marijuana, and hot tubs. Board and management meetings to discuss new ideas moved from formal events at hotel meeting rooms to more casual gatherings at Bushnell's home, Cyan Engineering, and a coastal resort in Pajaro Dunes. Dress codes were considered atypical for a professional setting, with most working in jeans and tee shirts. Many of the workers hired early on to construct games were hippies who knew enough to help to solder components together and took minimal wages. Several former employees, speaking in years that followed, described this as the common culture of the 1970s and not unique to Atari.

This approach changed in 1978 after Ray Kassar was brought on from Warner initially to help with marketing but eventually took on a larger role in the company, displacing Bushnell and Keenan, and instituting more formal employee policies for the company.

As a subsidiary of Warner Communications

Under Nolan Bushnell (1976–1978)
Ahead of entering the home console market, Atari recognized they needed additional capital to support this market, and though they had acquired smaller investments through 1975, they needed a larger infusion of funds. Bushnell had considered going public, then tried to sell the company to MCA and Disney but they passed. Instead, after at least six months of negotiations in 1976, Atari took an acquisition offer from Warner Communications for  that was completed in November 1976, of which Bushnell received . Bushnell was kept as chairman and CEO while Keenan was retained as president. For Warner, the deal represented an opportunity to buoy their underperforming film and music business divisions. Along with Warner's purchase, Atari had established its new headquarters in the Moffett Park area in Sunnyvale, California.

During Atari's negotiations with Warner, Fairchild Camera and Instrument announced the Fairchild Channel F for release in November 1976. The Channel F was the first programmable home console that used cartridges to play different games. Following Warner's acquisition, they provided  into Stella's development, allowing Atari to complete the console by early 1977. Its announcement on June 4, 1977, may have been delayed until after June 1, 1977, to wait out the terms of the Magnavox settlement from the earlier Pong patent lawsuit so they would not have to disclose information on it. The Atari VCS was released in September 1977. Most of the launch titles for the console were games based on Atari's success arcade games, such as Combat that incorporated elements of both Tank and Jet Fighter. The company made around 400,000 Atari VCS units for the 1977 holiday season, most which were sold but the company had lost around  due to production problems that caused some units to be delivered late to retailers.

In addition to the VCS, Atari continued to manufacture dedicated home console units through 1977 though discontinued these by 1978 and destroyed their unsold stock. Another one-off device from the consumer products division released in 1977 was Atari Video Music, a computerized device that took in audio input and created graphics displays to a monitor. The unit did not sell well and was discontinued in 1978.

Atari continued its arcade game line as it built up its consumer division. Breakout in 1976 was one of Atari's last games based on transistor–transistor logic (TTL) discrete logic design before the company transitioned to microprocessors. It was engineered by Steve Wozniak based on Bushnell's concept of a single-player Pong, and using as few TTL chips as possible from an informal challenge given to Wozniak by fellow Atari employee Steve Jobs. Breakout was successful, selling around 11,000 units, and Atari still struggled to meet demand. Atari exported a limited number of units to Namco via its prior Atari Japan venture, and led Namco to create its own clone of the game to meet demand in Japan, and helped to establish Namco as a major company in the Japanese video game industry.  Subsequently, Atari moved to microprocessors for its arcade games such as Cops ‘N Robbers, Sprint 2, Tank 8, and Night Driver.

Alongside continuing work in arcade game development and their preparations to launch the Atari VCS, Atari launched two more products in 1977. The first was their Atari Pinball division, which included Steve Ritchie and Eugene Jarvis. Around 1976, Atari had been concerned that arcade operators were getting nervous on the prospects of future arcade games, and thus launched their own pinball machines to accompany their arcade games. Atari's pinball machines were built following the technology principles they had learned from arcade and home console games, using solid-state electronics over electro-mechanical components to make them easier to design and repair. The division released about ten different pinball units between 1977 and 1979. Many of the machines were considered to be innovative for their time but were difficult to produce and meet distributors' demand. The second new venture in 1977 was the first of the Pizza Time Theatre (later known as Chuck E. Cheese), based on the pizza arcade concept that Bushnell had from the start. At this stage, the concept also allowed Atari to bypass problems with getting their arcade games placed into arcades by effectively controlling the arcade itself, while also creating a family-friendly environment. The first restaurant/arcade launched in San Jose, California in May 1977.

Atari hired in more programmers after releasing the VCS to start a second wave of games for release in 1978. In contrast to the launch titles that were inspired by Atari's arcade games, the second batch of games released in 1978 were more novel ideas including some based on board games, and were more difficult to sell. Warner's Manny Gerard, who oversaw Atari, brought in Ray Kassar, formerly a vice president at Burlington Industries, to help market Atari's products. Kassar was hired in February 1978 as president of the Atari consumer division. Kassar helped to develop a commercialization strategy for these games through 1978, and oversaw the creation of a new marketing campaign featuring multiple celebrities unified under the slogan "Don't Watch TV Tonight, Play It", and bringing in celebrities to help advertise these games. Kassar also instituted programs to increase production of the VCS and improve quality assurance of the console and games. As they approached the end of 1978, Atari had prepared 800,000 VCS units, but sales were languishing ahead of the holiday sales period.

Kassar's influence on Atari grew throughout 1978, leading to conflict between Bushnell and Warner Communications. Among other concerns about the direction Kassar was taking the company, Bushnell cautioned Warner that they needed to continue to innovate on the home console and could not simply release games for the VCS indefinitely like a music business. In a November 1978 meeting with Warner Communications, Bushnell said to Gerard that they had produced far too many VCS units to be sold that season and Atari's consumer division would suffer a major loss. Warner removed Bushnell as chairman and co-CEO of the company, but offered to let him stay on as a director and creative consultant. Bushnell refused and left the company. Keenan was moved to Atari's chairman and Kassar assigned as president after Bushnell's departure; Keenan left the company a few months later to join Bushnell in managing Pizza Time Theatre, and Kassar was promoted to CEO and chairman of Atari.

Under Ray Kassar (1979-1982)
With Bushnell's departure, Kassar implemented significant changes in the workplace culture in early 1979 to make it more professional, and cancelled several of the engineering programs that Bushnell had established. Kassar also had expressed some frustration with the programmers at Atari, and was known to have called them "spoiled brats" and "prima donnas" at times.

The changes in management style led to rising tensions from the game developers at Atari who had been used to freedom in developing their titles. One example was Superman in 1979, one of the first movie tie-ins that had been sought by Warner to accompany the release of the 1978 film. Warner, through Kassar, had pressured Warren Robinett to convert his game-in-progress Adventure from a generic adventure game to the Superman-themed title. Robinett refused, but did help fellow programmer John Dunn to make the conversion after he volunteered. Further, after Warner refused to include programmer credits into game manuals over concern that competitors may try to hire them away, Robinett secretly stuck his name into Adventure in one of the first known Easter eggs as to bypass this issue. The transition from Bushnell to Kassar led to a large number of departures from the company over the next few years. Four of Atari's programmers—David Crane, Bob Whitehead, Larry Kaplan, and Alan Miller—whose games had contributed collectively to over 60% of the company's game sales in 1978, left Atari in mid-1979 after requesting and being denied additional compensation for their performance, and formed Activision in October of that year to make their own Atari VCS games based on their knowledge of the console. Similarly, Rob Fulop, who programmed the arcade conversion of Missile Command for the VCS in 1981 that sold over 2.5 million units, received only a minimal bonus that year, and left with other disgruntled Atari programmers to form Imagic in 1981.

Beginning in 1979, the Atari coin-operated games division started releasing cabinets incorporating vector graphics displays after the success of the Cinematronics game Space Wars in 1977–78. Their first vector graphics game, Lunar Lander, was a modest success, but their second arcade title, Asteroids, was highly popular, displacing Space Invaders as the most popular game in the United States. Atari produced over 70,000 Asteroids cabinets, and made an estimated  from sales. Asteroids along with Space Invaders helped to usher in the golden age of arcade video games that lasted until around 1983; Atari contributed several more games that were considered part of this golden age, including Missile Command, Centipede, and Tempest.

A project to design a successor to the VCS started as soon as the system shipped in mid-1977. The original development team, including Meyer, Miner and Decuir, estimated the VCS had a lifespan of about three years, and decided to build the most powerful machine they could given that time frame. They set a goal to be able to support 1978-vintage arcade games, as well as features of the upcoming personal computer such as the Apple II. The project resulted in the first home computers from Atari, the Atari 800 and Atari 400, both launched in 1979. These computer systems were mostly closed systems, and most of the initial games were developed by Atari, drawing from programmers from the VCS line. Sales into early 1980 were poor and there was little to distinguish the computer line from the current console products. In March 1980, the company released Star Raiders, a space combat game developed by Doug Neubauer based on Star Trek game that had been popular on mainframe computers. Star Raiders became the Atari 400/800 system seller, but quickly emphasized the lack of software for the computers due to the system's closed nature and the limited rate that Atari's programmers could produce titles. Third-party programmers found means to get technical information about the computer specifications either directly from Atari employees or from reverse engineering, and by late 1980, third-party applications and games began to emerge for the 8-bit computer family, and the specialized magazine ANALOG Computing was established for Atari computer programmers to share programming information. While Atari did not formally release development information, they supported this external community by launching the Atari Program Exchange (APX) in 1981, a mail-order service that programmers could offer their applications and games to other users of Atari's 8-bit computers. By this point, Atari's computers were facing new competition from the VIC-20.

A short-lived Atari Electronics division was created to make electronic games that ran from 1979 to 1981. They successfully released one product, a handheld version of Atari's arcade Touch Me game, which played similar to Simon, in 1979. The division began work on Cosmos, a system that was to combine LED lights and a holographic screen. Atari had promoted the game at the 1981 CES, but following Alcorn's departure in 1981, opted not to follow through on making it and closed down the Electronics division.

Moving into 1980, the VCS still lacked a system-selling game. After Space Invaders had hit arcades in 1979, Warner instructed Kassar to try to get the rights to an arcade conversion for the game from Taito, while prototype work had already been started on a possible game by Rick Maurer on his own. Once Kassar has secured the rights, Maurer was able to take his work to a form for the VCS, and Space Invaders for the VCS was released in March 1980. The game became the VCS's "killer app", helping to sell the console alongside the game, and made Atari an estimated . It also set a roadmap for future game releases on the VCS under Kassar, with more scheduled release plans throughout the year and looking for more licensed arcade conversions and tie-in media.

Until 1980, the Atari VCS was the only major programmable console on the market and Atari the only supplier for its games, but that year is when Atari began to experience its first major competition as Mattel Electronics brought the Intellivision to market. Activision also released its first set of third-party games for the Atari VCS. Atari took action against Activision starting 1980, first by trying to tarnish the company's reputation, then by taking legal action accusing the four programmers of stealing trade secrets and violating non-disclosure agreements. This lawsuit was eventually settled out of court in 1982, with Activision agreeing to pay a small license fee to Atari for every game sold. This effectively validated Activision's development model and made them the first third-party developer in the industry.

In 1980, Namco produced the arcade game Pac-Man, and it reached the United States market by the end of the year. Pac-Man soon became a nationwide success, surpassing the popularity of Asteroids and creating a wave of "Pac-Mania". Atari was able to secure an exclusive deal with Namco to be able to convert Pac-Man to home arcade systems, starting with the Atari VCS version. Atari's management believed that the game would be a sure-fire hit in the same manner as Space Invaders. However, little attention was devoted to the game itself which was being developed solely by Tod Frye. While Frye was able to get a version of Pac-Man on the VCS within the system's limitations, the resulting game was critically panned for many technical issues such as excessive flickering of the on-screen characters. Pac-Man was released in March 1982, with Atari running several promotions to increase sales. However, because of the poor technical implementation, Pac-Man caused consumers to become more cautious on rushing to purchase new games in the future, and tarnished Atari's image given that the company was trying to compete against low-quality third-party titles that were starting to flood the market.

Atari discovered in 1981 that General Computer Corporation (GCC) had developed hardware that could be installed onto arcade games to give operators additional options to modify the game, such as their Super Missile Attack board that modified Atari's Missile Command. Atari initially filed suit to stop GCC's products but as they learned more about their products, recognized that GCC had talented engineers, as one of their other products, a modification board for Pac-Man was sold back to Midway and eventually became the basis of Ms. Pac-Man. Atari settled with GCC out of court and brought the company on in a consulting position. GCC developed arcade and VCS games for Atari, and also programmed most of the games for the upcoming Atari 5200 system.

Atari launched its second major programmable console, the Atari 5200, in late 1982. The unit was based on the same design features that had gone into the Atari 800 and Atari 400 computers, but repackaged as a home console. Alongside the 5200's release, Atari announced it was rebranding the Atari VCS as the Atari 2600 to create a more consist product naming system. The Atari 5200 did not do well on the market as it lacked backward compatibility with Atari VCS/2600 cartridges, a feature offered by the Colecovision. The Atari 5200 only sold about one million units before it was discontinued in 1984.

By the end of 1982, Atari had hired 4,000 additional employees for a total of 10,000 across its three divisions of arcade games, consumer home consoles, and home computers. The company had more than fifty facilities in the Silicon Valley area. For the first nine months of 1982, Atari contributed half of Warner's  revenue and one-third of their  operating profit  However, at the same time, the company was seeing a high rate of turnover in management positions, which Kassar attributed to the rapid growth of the company.

The video game crash of 1983
To try to remain competitive against Mattel's Intellivision, Atari requested all of its distributors to commit to orders for home console games in 1982 in October 1981, as to allow Atari to anticipate production numbers and meet the expected demand. Distributors expected Atari's games to do well and ordered in large volumes, placing more orders than expected given Atari's past failures to meet demand. By the middle of 1982, a new home console marketplace had appeared, which one distributor called "a totally different business". In addition to Mattel, Coleco had introduced the Colecovision, which shipped in August 1982 with an arcade conversion of the popular Donkey Kong as a pack-in game and add-ons that could play Atari 2600 games. Further, Activision, Imagic, and other third-party game developers like Parker Brothers had started releasing Atari 2600 titles that rivaled Atari's own games, reducing Atari's market share of games to 40%. Distributors started to cancel the Atari orders they had placed the prior year, which Gerard said they were "blind-sided" by, having never faced this type of competition before.

Additionally around October 1981, Atari looked to other licensed properties for games. They secured the rights for Raiders of the Lost Ark in late 1981 shortly after the release of the blockbuster film that was released earlier that year. Similarly, after the film E.T. the Extra-Terrestrial was released in June 1982, Atari was able to quickly negotiate a license, estimated to have cost Atari , to make a video game based on the film, which was programmed by Howard Scott Warshaw over a period of five weeks to be able to produce the game for the 1982 holiday seasons. Raiders and E.T. were released in November and December 1982, respectively. As distributors had already cancelled orders, these and other games started to stockpile in Atari's warehouses without any sellers. Neither game sold as much as Atari had expected; notably, E.T. was critically panned and later became known as one of the worst games ever made, and of five million copies produced, only 1.5 million were sold.

In December 1982, Warner Communications announced that it was expecting significant decline in investor earnings of about 40% for the fourth quarter of the year mostly as a result of slower game cartridge sales from Atari. Warner still remained confident that overall it would see a 10 to 15% growth through 1982, which it considered fair given the current recession. However, earlier in 1982, Warner had expected a 50% growth and using Atari's profits to help support Warner's other media industries, and analysts were less confident in Warner's current outlook; one asked "Why did it happen so quickly? And why were they not in tune with it while it was building?" Later that month, Warner announced that Kassar along with one other Atari executive had sold numerous shares of Warner stock prior to the investor announcement and were engaged with insider trading. Kassar signed a consent agreement neither admitting nor denying the charges.

Atari was still struggling with excess inventory of its Atari 2600 games, and the Atari 5200 had not been as successful as the 2600. The golden age of the arcade was waning, and the arcade division was failing to turn a profit. Further, Atari's venture into home computers was not as successful, as they were losing a price war with Commodore International.

Atari had gained a poor reputation in the industry. One dealer told InfoWorld in early 1984 that "It has totally ruined my business ... Atari has ruined all the independents." A non-Atari executive stated: "There were so many screaming, shouting, threatening dialogues, it's unbelievable that any company in America could conduct itself the way Atari conducted itself. Atari used threats, intimidation and bullying. It's incredible that anything could be accomplished. Many people left Atari. There was incredible belittling and humiliation of people. We'll never do business with them again." Stating that "Atari has never made a dime in microcomputers", John J. Anderson wrote in early 1984, "Many of the people I spoke to at Atari between 1980 and 1983 had little or no idea what the products they were selling were all about, or who if anyone would care. In one case, we were fed mis- and disinformation on a frighteningly regular basis, from a highly-placed someone supposedly in charge of all publicity concerning the computer systems. And chilling as the individual happenstance was, it seems to have been endemic at Atari at the time.":

Despite losses, Atari remained the number one console maker in every market except Japan. Nintendo, a Japanese video game company, planned to release its first programmable video game console, the Famicom (later branded as Nintendo Entertainment System (NES)) in Japan in July 1983. Looking to sell the console in international markets that same year, Nintendo offered a licensing deal whereby Atari would build and sell the system, paying Nintendo a royalty. The deal was in the works throughout 1983, and the two companies tentatively decided to sign the agreement at the June 1983 CES. However, Coleco demonstrated its new Adam computer with Nintendo's Donkey Kong. Kassar was furious, as Atari owned the rights to publish Donkey Kong for computers, which he accused Nintendo of violating. Nintendo, in turn, criticized Coleco, which only owned the console rights to the game. Coleco had legal grounds to challenge the claim though since Atari had only purchased the floppy disk rights to the game, while the Adam version was cartridge-based. Negotiations became protracted after Kassar's departure in mid-1983, and with any deal unlikely to be realized before year-end sales, Nintendo dropped out. Instead, Nintendo worked through their Nintendo of America subsidiary to release the system on their own in 1985.

In 1983, the company set up a partnership with MCA Videogames, a division of MCA Inc. to set up a joint venture Studio Games, whereas the venture gave them access to properties handled by MCA's sister studio Universal Pictures.

Kassar eventually resigned as CEO of Atari in July 1983 over mounting financial losses, and Warner replaced him with James J. Morgan, a vice president from Philip Morris Inc. Stating "one company can't have seven presidents", Morgan stated a goal of more closely integrating the company's divisions to end "the fiefdoms and the politics and all the things that caused the problems". Morgan implemented processes to reduce operating costs at Atari, including laying off about 3,000 jobs and moving 4,000 more manufacturing positions to Asia.

The company discreetly buried more 700,000 units of its unsold stock in a landfill near Alamogordo, New Mexico in September 1983, though this had become an urban legend that millions of unsold cartridges were buried there.

Atari's problems reverberated across the entire video game industry in the United States as consumer confidence in video games had weakened significantly, contributing significantly to the video game crash of 1983. Retailers became wary of selling video games, making it difficult for console and video game manufacturers to sell their products. Further, the rising popularity of home computers drove sales away from game consoles. To clear stock as to make way to new games, retailers also heavily discounted consoles and games which also hurt these companies financially. Many of the new companies that had sprung up to take advantage of the rising growth of video games prior to 1983 shut down, liquidating their assets and further contributing to the excess unsold stock. Established companies like Atari faced difficulty in selling their products against these volumes, which further contributed to their losses.

Despite its financial issues, Atari continued to innovate. In March 1983, it established an Ataritel division to develop telephones with screens and computer features with consumer-ready products to reach market by 1984. In October 1983, Atari created its Atarisoft division, producing software from its own library to work on its rival systems including for computers from Commodore, Apple, Texas Instruments, and IBM, as well as console games for Colecovision. GCC, inspired by the Atari 2600 add-ons available for the Colecovision and for the Atari 5200, start working on the design of a new console, one that would be more advanced than the 2600 but would support direct compatibility with Atari 2600 games. Their project resulted in the Atari 7800 ProSystem, which had been announced in early 1984. Morgan had shut down the Atari 5200 production towards Atari 7800 manufacturing for its mid-1984 release, but with Warner's sale of the company in June 1984, the launch was cancelled. The Atari 7800 was later introduced under the Atari Corporation branding in May 1986.

Breakup and sale (1984)
By the end of 1983, Warner's stock price slid from $60 to $20, and the company began searching for a buyer for Atari. When Texas Instruments exited the home-computer market in November 1983 because of the price war with Commodore, many believed that Atari would be next. Its Atarisoft games for rival computers sold well, and a rumor stated that Atari planned to discontinue hardware and only sell software. Morgan stated that he expected to bring the company back to profitability by mid-1984, though warned he was expecting more losses for the first six months of the year.

Tramiel merged these assets into his own Tramel Technology Limited, which he renamed Atari Corporation. In the transition, Morgan was given "a leave of several months", with Tramiel's son Sam Tramiel and other of his aides already taking leadership of the company. Warner renamed Atari, Inc. to Atari Games, which now primarily consisted of the coin-operated games, arcade operations, and Ataritel divisions. Ataritel was sold to Mitsubishi later in 1984; Mitsubishi released one of the first digital videophones based on Atari's original designs under the brand Lumaphone by 1986.

Under Tramiel, the Atari Corporation initially focused heavily on home computers before it revisited game consoles, including a revised design of the Atari 2600, the Atari 2600 Jr., but eventually dropped out of the hardware market by 1996 following the failure of the Atari Jaguar console. In 1998 the Atari Corporation properties were acquired by Hasbro Interactive, which was subsequently sold to Infogrames in 2001, with Infogrames rebranding itself as Atari SA and holding most of the intellectual property rights to the console games developed by Atari, Inc. 

Warner sold a majority stake in Atari Games to Namco in 1985 while retaining a 40% share. Namco later lost interest in operating Atari Games and sold 33% of its shares to a group of employees led by then-president Hideyuki Nakajima in 1986. As the company was now split between three entities, Warner (40%), Namco (40%), and the employees (20%), and none of them held a controlling share, Atari Games effectively became an independent company. The company re-entered home console publishing as well, but unable to use the Atari name in the home market as the rights were held by Atari Corporation, they created a subsidiary called Tengen for console publishing. In 1994, Time Warner, as the company had become known following its merger with Time Inc., bought out Namco's share of the company, placing it under their new Time Warner Interactive label. After only two years, it was sold again to WMS Industries in 1996, and made part of Midway Games when that company was spun off as an independent company in 1998 as the Midway Games West studio. The studio was disbanded in 2003, marking the end of continuous operations of the last remaining part of the original Atari. The Atari Games library was retained by Midway until 2009, when amidst financial troubles, the company was sold to Warner Bros. Interactive Entertainment.

Products

Hardware products
Home Pong (1975)
Stunt Cycle (1976)
Atari Video Music (1977)
Video Pinball (1977)
Atari 2600 (1977)
Atari 8-bit family (1979)
Atari 2700 (cancelled)
Atari Cosmos (cancelled)
Atari 5200 (1982)

Arcade and other amusement games

Arcade games
Anti-Aircraft
Asteroids
Asteroids Deluxe
Atari Baseball
Atari Basketball
Atari Football
Atari Soccer
Avalanche
Battlezone
Black Widow
Breakout
Canyon Bomber
Centipede
Cloak & Dagger
Cops N Robbers
Crash 'N Score
Crystal Castles
Destroyer
Dominos
Drag Race
Fire Truck
Firefox
Flyball
Food Fight
Goal IV
Gotcha
Gran Trak 10
Gran Trak 20
Gravitar
Hi-way
I, Robot
Indy 4
Indy 800
Jet Fighter
LeMans
Liberator
Lunar Lander
Major Havoc
Millipede
Missile Command
Monte Carlo
Night Driver
Orbit
Outlaw
Pin-Pong
Pong
Pong Doubles
Pool Shark
Pursuit
Quadrapong
Quantum
Quiz Show
Qwak!
Rebound
Red Baron
Return of the Jedi
Shark Jaws
Sky Diver
Sky Raider
Space Duel
Space Race
Sprint 1
Sprint 2
Sprint 4
Sprint 8
Star Wars
Starship 1
Steeplechase
Stunt Cycle
Subs
Super Breakout
Super Bug
Super Pong
Tank
Tank II
Tank 8
Tempest
Tournament Table
Triple Hunt
Tunnel Hunt
Ultra Tank
Video Pinball
Warlords
Unreleased arcade prototypes
Akka Arrh
Atari Mini Golf
Cannonball
Cloud 9
Firebeast
Maze Invaders
Missile Command 2
Runaway
Sebring
Solar War
Wolf Pack
Pinball machines
Airborne Avenger
The Atarians
Hercules
Middle Earth
Road Runner
Space Riders
Superman
Time 2000

Software
Atari's software is organized by platform:
 List of Atari 2600 games
 List of Atari 5200 games
 Atari 8-bit family software
 List of Atarisoft titles

See also

History of video games

Notes

References

Further reading

External links 
 The Atari History Museum - Atari historical archive site.
 Atari Times, supporting all Atari consoles.
 AtariAge.com
 Atari entry at MobyGames
 Atari Gaming Headquarters - Atari historical archive site.
 Atari On Film - List of Atari products in films.
 The Dot Eaters - Comprehensive history of videogames, extensive info on Atari offerings and history
 History of Atari from 1978 to 1981
 A History of Syzygy / Atari  / Atari Games  / Atari Holdings
 Nob6.com

Atari
American companies established in 1972
Companies based in Sunnyvale, California
Computer companies established in 1972
Video game companies established in 1972
American companies disestablished in 1992
Computer companies disestablished in 1992
Video game companies disestablished in 1992
Defunct computer companies of the United States
Defunct video game companies of the United States
Video game development companies
Video game publishers
Pinball manufacturers
1972 establishments in California
1992 disestablishments in California